Aserdaten is an unincorporated community and ghost town located within Lacey Township in Ocean County, New Jersey, United States.

The former community is located within the Greenwood Forest Wildlife Management Area, surrounded by the densely forested Pine Barrens.

In 1893, Aserdaten was noted by the United States Geological Survey as a "village in Lacey Township".

A forest fire watch tower, the Cedar Bridge Lookout Tower, was located in "the remote area of Aserdaten" until 1983.

References

Ghost towns in New Jersey
Lacey Township, New Jersey
Unincorporated communities in Ocean County, New Jersey
Unincorporated communities in New Jersey